Hoodoo is the sixteenth studio album by the Swiss hard rock/heavy metal band Krokus. It includes a cover of the Steppenwolf song "Born to be Wild". The album failed to reach the Billboard Top 200 in the U.S., unlike their last album (Hellraiser), but the release was successful overseas. The song "Hoodoo Woman" is featured on the soundtrack of the movie Saw 3D.

The album has received mixed to positive reviews from publications such as About.com and Allmusic. Critic Chad Bower of About.com labeled the release as being "packed with big hooks arena ready anthems". Critic Alexey Eremenko praised the album for Allmusic as having the band "rocking as hard as ever", with "dirty, swaggering" hard rock songs.

Hoodoo was certified Platinum in Switzerland.

Track listing

Personnel
Band members
Marc Storace – lead vocals
Fernando von Arb – lead and rhythm guitar, piano, bass, backing vocals
Mark Kohler – rhythm and lead guitar, bass
Chris von Rohr – bass, piano, drums, percussion, backing vocals, producer
Freddy Steady – drums, percussion

Additional musicians
Mark Fox – vocals
Kenny Aronoff – drums

Production
Dennis Ward – engineer, mixing
Jürg Neageli, Steve Churchyard – additional engineering
Ted Jensen – mastering at Sterling Sound, New York City

Charts

Certifications

References

Krokus (band) albums
2010 albums
Columbia Records albums